Greben Hill (‘Halm Greben’ \'h&lm 'gre-ben\) is the hill rising to 924 m in Srednogorie Heights on Trinity Peninsula, Antarctic Peninsula.  Situated 2.81 km north-northwest of Ledenika Peak, 5.12 km southwest of Corner Peak and 3.42 km southeast of Hanson Hill.  Surmounting Malorad Glacier to the north.

The hill is named after Greben Mountain in western Bulgaria.

Location
German-British mapping in 1996.

Maps
 Trinity Peninsula. Scale 1:250000 topographic map No. 5697. Institut für Angewandte Geodäsie and British Antarctic Survey, 1996.
 Antarctic Digital Database (ADD). Scale 1:250000 topographic map of Antarctica. Scientific Committee on Antarctic Research (SCAR). Since 1993, regularly upgraded and updated.

References
 Bulgarian Antarctic Gazetteer. Antarctic Place-names Commission. (details in Bulgarian, basic data in English)
 Greben Hill. SCAR Composite Antarctic Gazetteer

External links
 Greben Hill. Copernix satellite image

Hills of Trinity Peninsula
Bulgaria and the Antarctic